Eriphioides is a genus of moths in the subfamily Arctiinae. The genus was described by William Forsell Kirby in 1892.

Species
 Eriphioides ecuadoriensis Draudt, 1915
 Eriphioides fastidiosa Dyar, 1916
 Eriphioides phaeoptera Dognin, 1912
 Eriphioides purpurinus Dognin, 1923
 Eriphioides simplex Rothschild, 1912
 Eriphioides surinamensis Möschler, 1877
 Eriphioides tractipennis Butler, 1876
 Eriphioides ustulata Felder, 1869

References

Arctiinae